In anthropology and demography, the human sex ratio is the ratio of males to females in a population. Like most sexual species, the sex ratio in humans is close to 1:1. In humans, the natural ratio at birth between males and females is slightly biased towards the male sex: it is estimated to be about 1.05 or 1.06 or within a narrow range from 1.03 to 1.06 males per female.

More data are available for humans than for any other species, and the human sex ratio is more studied than that of any other species, but interpreting these statistics can be difficult. The sex ratio of the total population is affected by various factors including natural factors, exposure to pesticides and environmental contaminants, war casualties, effects of war on men, sex-selective abortions, infanticides, aging, gendercide and problems with birth registration.

The sex ratio for the entire world population is approximately 101 males to 100 females (2021 est.). Human sex ratios, either at birth or in the population as a whole, can be reported in any of four ways: the ratio of males to females, the ratio of females to males, the proportion of males, or the proportion of females. If there are 108,000 males and 100,000 females the ratio of males to females is 1.080 and the proportion of males is 51.9%. Scientific literature often uses the proportion of males. This article uses the ratio of males to females, unless specified otherwise.

Natural ratio at birth 

In a study around 2002, the natural sex ratio at birth was estimated to be within a narrow range of 1.07 to 1.03
males/female. Some scholars suggest that countries considered to have significant practices of prenatal sex-selection are those with birth sex ratios of 1.08 and above (selection against females) and 1.02 and below (selection against males). This assumption has been questioned by some scholars.

Infant mortality is significantly higher in boys than girls in most parts of the world. Often this is explained as due to biological and genetic sex differences, with boys more biologically vulnerable to premature death and disease. Recent studies have found that numerous preconception or prenatal environmental factors affect the probabilities of a baby being conceived male or female. It has been proposed that these environmental factors also explain sex differences in mortality. In most populations, adult males tend to have higher death rates than adult females of the same age (even after allowing for causes specific to females such as death in childbirth), due to both natural causes such as heart attacks and strokes, which account for by far the majority of deaths, and also violent causes, such as homicide and warfare. Thus females have a higher life expectancy. For example, in the United States, as of 2006, an adult non-elderly male was 3 to 6 times more likely to become a victim of a homicide and 2.5 to 3.5 times more likely to die in an accident than a female of the same age.

In the United States, the sex ratios at birth over the period 1970–2002 were 1.05 for the white non-Hispanic population, 1.04 for Mexican Americans, 1.03 for African Americans and Indians, and 1.07 for mothers of Chinese or Filipino ethnicity. Among Western European countries around 2001, the ratios ranged from 1.04 in Belgium to 1.07 in Switzerland, Italy, Ireland and Portugal. In the aggregated results of 56 demographic and health surveys in African countries, the ratio is 1.03, albeit with considerable country-to-country variation.

There is controversy about whether sex ratios outside the 1.03–1.07 range are due to sex selection, as suggested by some scholars, or due to natural causes. Some scholars argue that strong socioeconomic factors such as the dowry system in India and the one child policy of China are responsible for prenatal sex selection. In a widely cited article, Amartya Sen supported such views. Other researchers argue that an unbalanced sex ratio should not be automatically held as evidence of prenatal sex selection; Michel Garenne reports that many African nations have, over decades, had birth sex ratios below 1.00: that is, more girls are born than boys. Angola, Botswana and Namibia have reported birth sex ratios between 0.94 and 0.99, which is quite different from the presumed "normal" sex ratio, meaning that significantly more girls have been born in such societies.

In an extensive study, carried out around 2005, of sex ratio at birth in the United States from 1940 over 62 years, statistical evidence suggested the following:
 For mothers having their first baby, the total sex ratio at birth was 1.06 overall, with some years at 1.07.
 For mothers having babies after the first, this ratio consistently decreased with each additional baby from 1.07 towards 1.03.
 The age of the mother affected the ratio:
 the overall ratio was 1.05 for mothers aged 25 to 35 at the time of birth
 mothers who were below the age of 15 or above 40 had babies with a sex ratio ranging between 0.94 and 1.11, and a total sex ratio of 1.05

History 
The human sex ratio at birth has been an object of study since early in the history of statistics, as it is easily recorded and a large number for sufficiently large populations. An early researcher was John Arbuthnot (1710), who in modern terms, performed statistical hypothesis testing, computing the p-value (via a sign test), interpreted it as statistical significance, and rejected the null hypothesis.

Human sex at birth was also analyzed and used as an example by Jacob Bernoulli in Ars Conjectandi (1713), in which an unequal sex ratio is a natural example of a Bernoulli trial with uneven odds. Willem 's Gravesande (1774) also studied it. Pierre-Simon Laplace (1778) used human sex ratio as an example in his development of probability theory. He considered the statistics of almost half a million births; the statistics showed an excess of boys compared to girls. He concluded by calculation of a p-value that the excess was a real, but unexplained, effect.

Factors affecting sex ratio in humans

Fisher's principle 
Fisher's principle is an explanation of why the sex ratio of most species is approximately 1:1. Outlined by Ronald Fisher in his 1930 book, it is an argument in terms of parental expenditure. Essentially he argues that the 1:1 ratio is the evolutionarily stable strategy. Many species deviate from an even sex ratio, either periodically or permanently. Examples include parthenogenic species, periodically mating organisms such as aphids, some eusocial wasps, bees, ants, and termites.

Natural factors 
The natural factors that affect the human sex ratio are an active area of scientific research. Over 1000 articles have been published in various journals. Two of the often cited reviews of scientific studies on human sex ratio are by W. H. James. The scientific studies are based on extensive birth and death records in Africa, the Americas, Asia, Australia, and Europe. A few of these studies extend to over 100 years of yearly human sex ratio data for some countries. These studies suggest that the human sex ratio, both at birth and as a population matures, can vary significantly according to a large number of factors, such as paternal age, maternal age, multiple births, birth order, gestation weeks, race, parent's health history, and parent's psychological stress. Remarkably, the trends in human sex ratio are not consistent across countries at a given time, or over time for a given country. In economically developed countries, as well as developing countries, these scientific studies have found that the human sex ratio at birth has historically varied between 0.94 and 1.15 for natural reasons.

In a scientific paper published in 2008, James states that conventional assumptions have been:
 there are equal numbers of X and Y chromosomes in mammalian sperm
 X and Y stand equal chance of achieving conception
 therefore equal numbers of male and female zygotes are formed
 therefore any variation of sex ratio at birth is due to sex selection between conception and birth.

James cautions that available scientific evidence stands against the above assumptions and conclusions. He reports that there is an excess of males at birth in almost all human populations, and the natural sex ratio at birth is usually between 1.02 and 1.08. However, the ratio may deviate significantly from this range for natural reasons.

An analysis study from 2015 showed that human sex ratio at conception is roughly 50%, but rises due to total mortality surplus of female embryos. A dataset of 139,704 embryos derived from assisted reproductive technology showed a male sex ratio of 50.2%. A dataset of 4,999 embryos from induced abortions showed a rate of 51.1% for the first trimester and 55.9% for the last two trimesters.

Plural birth
A 1999 scientific paper published by Jacobsen reported the sex ratio for 815,891 children born in Denmark between 1980 and 1993. They studied the birth records to identify the effects of multiple birth, birth order, age of parents and the sexes of preceding siblings on the proportion of males using contingency tables, chi-squared tests and regression analysis. The secondary sex ratio decreased with increasing number of children per plural birth and with paternal age, whereas no significant independent effect was observed for maternal age, birth order, or other natural factors.

Length of gestation 
A 2009 research paper published by Branum et al. reports the sex ratio derived from data in United States birth records over a 25-year period (1981–2006). This paper reports that the sex ratio at birth for the white ethnic group in the United States was 1.04 when the gestational age was 33–36 weeks, but 1.15 for gestational ages of less than 28 weeks, 28–32 weeks, and 37 or more weeks. This study also found that the sex ratios at birth in the United States, between 1981 and 2006, were lower in both black and Hispanic ethnic groups when compared with non-Hispanic white ethnic group.

A research group led by Ein-Mor reported that sex ratio does not seem to change significantly with either maternal or paternal age. Neither gravidity nor parity seem to affect the male-to-female ratio. However, there is a significant association of sex ratio with the length of gestation. These Ein-mor conclusions have been disputed. For example, James suggested that Ein-Mor results are based on some demographic variables and a small data set, a broader study of variables and larger population set suggests human sex ratio shows substantial variation for various reasons and different trend effects of length of gestation than those reported by Ein-Mor. In another study, James has offered the hypothesis that human sex ratios, and mammalian sex ratios in general, are causally related to the hormone levels of both parents at the time of conception. This hypothesis is yet to be tested and proven true or false over large population sets.

Environmental factors

Effects of climate change 
Various scientists have examined the question whether human birth sex ratios have historically been affected by environmental stressors such as climate change and global warming. Several studies show that high temperature raises proportion of male births, but the reasons for this are disputed. Catalano et al. report that cold weather is an environmental stressor, and women subjected to colder weather abort frail male fetuses in greater proportion, thereby lowering birth sex ratios. Cold weather stressors also extend male longevity, thereby raising the human sex ratio at older ages. The Catalano team found that a 1 °C increase in annual temperature predicts one more male than expected for every 1,000 females born in a year.

Helle et al. studied 138 years of human birth sex ratio data, from 1865 to 2003. They find an increased excess of male births during periods of exogenous stress (World War II) and during warm years. In the warmest period over the 138 years, the birth sex ratio peaked at about 1.08 in Northern Europe. The increase in the sex ratio for each 1 °C increase in temperature was approximately the same as the result found by the Catalano team.

Effects of gestation environment 
Causes of stress during gestation, such as maternal malnutrition, generally appear to increase fetal deaths, particularly among males, resulting in a lower sex ratio at birth. A higher incidence of Hepatitis B virus in a population is believed to increase the sex ratio, while some unexplained environmental health hazards are thought to have the opposite effect.

The effects of gestational environment on human sex ratio are complicated and unclear, with numerous conflicting reports. For example, Oster et al. examined a data set of 67,000 births in China, 15 percent of whom were Hepatitis B carriers. They found no effect on birth sex ratio from Hepatitis B presence in either mothers or fathers.

Effects of chemical pollution 

A 2007 survey by the Arctic Monitoring and Assessment Program noted abnormally low sex ratios  in Russian Arctic villages and Inuit villages in Greenland and Canada, and attributed this imbalance to high levels of endocrine disruptors in the blood of inhabitants, including PCBs and DDT. These chemicals are believed to have accumulated in the tissues of fish and animals that make up the bulk of these populations' diets. However, as noted in the Social factors section below, it is important to exclude alternative explanations, including social ones, when examining large human populations whose composition by ethnicity and race may be changing.

A 2008 report provides further evidence of effects of feminizing chemicals on male development in each class of vertebrate species as a worldwide phenomenon, possibly leading to a decline in the sex ratio in humans and a possible decline in sperm counts. Out of over 100,000 recently introduced chemicals, 99% are poorly regulated. 

Other factors that could possibly affect the sex ratio include:
 Social status of the mother, known to be a factor in influencing the sex ratio of certain animals such as swine, but apparently not in humans.
 Whether the mother has a partner or other support network, although this correlation is widely considered to be the result of an unknown third factor.
 Latitude, with countries near the equator producing more females than near the poles.

Other scientific studies suggest that environmental effects on human sex ratio at birth are either limited or not properly understood. For example, a research paper published in 1999, by scientists from Finland's National Public Health Institute, reports the effect of environmental chemicals and changes in sex ratio over 250 years in Finland. This scientific team evaluated whether Finnish long-term data are compatible with the hypothesis that the decrease in the ratio of male to female births in industrial countries is caused by environmental factors. They analyzed the sex ratio of births from the files of Statistics Finland and all live births in Finland from 1751 to 1997. They found an increase in the proportion of males from 1751 to 1920; this was followed by a decrease and interrupted by peaks in births of males during and after World War I and World War II. None of the natural factors such as paternal age, maternal age, age difference of parents or birth order could explain the time trends. The scientists found that the peak sex ratio precedes the period of industrialization and the introduction of pesticides or hormonal drugs, rendering a causal association between environmental chemicals and human sex ratio at birth unlikely. Moreover, these scientists claim that the trends they found in Finland are similar to those observed in other countries with higher levels of pollution and much greater pesticide use.

Some studies have found that certain kinds of environmental pollution, specifically dioxins, are associated with a lower sex ratio.

Social factors

Population composition
As an example of how the social composition of a human population may produce unusual changes in sex ratios, in a study in several counties of California where declining sex ratios had been observed, Smith and Von Behren observe "In the raw data, the male birth proportion is indeed declining. However, during this period, there were also shifts in demographics that influence the sex ratio. Controlling for birth order, parents' age, and race/ethnicity, different trends emerged. White births (which account for over 80%) continued to show a statistically significant decline, while other racial groups showed non-statistically significant declines (Japanese-American, Native American, other), with little or no change (Black American), or an increase (Chinese-American). Finally, when the white births were divided into Hispanic and non-Hispanic (possible since 1982), it was found that both white subgroups suggest an increase in male births."  They concluded "that the decline in male births in California is largely attributable to changes in demographics."

Effects of war 
Increased sex ratio during and after a war is called the returning soldier effect. There is still no clear explanation of its mechanics.

Early marriage and parents' age 
Several studies have examined human birth sex ratio data to determine whether there is a natural relationship between the age of the mother or father and the birth sex ratio. For example, Ruder has studied 1.67 million births in 33 states in the United States to investigate the effect of parents' ages on birth sex ratios. Similarly, Jacobsen et al. have studied 820,000 births in Denmark with the same goal. These scientists find that maternal age has no statistically significant role on the human birth sex ratio. However, they report a significant effect of paternal age. Significantly more male babies were born per 1000 female babies to younger fathers than to older fathers. These studies suggest that social factors such as early marriage and males siring their children at a young age may play a role in raising birth sex ratios in certain societies.

Partnership status
It has been shown on a sample of 86,436 human births from a US population-based survey that 51.4% boys were born among together living married parents, 52.2% among together living unmarried parents and only 49.9% boys among apart living parents.

Economic factors 
Catalano has examined the hypothesis that population stress induced by a declining economy reduces the human sex ratio. He compared the sex ratio in East and West Germany for the years 1946 to 1999, with genetically similar populations. The population stressors theory predicts that the East German sex ratio should have been lower than expected in 1991, when East Germany's economy collapsed, than in previous years. The hypothesis further suggests that, over time, East German birth sex ratios should generally be lower than the observed sex ratios found in West Germany for the same years. According to Catalano's study, the birth sex ratio data from East Germany and West Germany over 45 years support the hypothesis. The sex ratio in East Germany was also at its lowest in 1991. According to Catalano's study, assuming women in East Germany did not opt to abort male fetuses more than female fetuses, the best hypothesis is that a collapsing economy lowers the human birth sex ratio, while a booming economy raises the birth sex ratio. Catalano notes that these trends may be related to the observed trend of an elevated occurrence of very low birth-weight babies from maternal stress, during certain macroeconomic circumstances.

Sex-selective abortion and infanticide

Sex-selective abortion and infanticide are thought to significantly skew the naturally occurring ratio in some populations, such as China, where the introduction of ultrasound scans in the late 1980s has led to a birth sex ratio (males to females) of 1.181 (2010 official census data for China). The 2011 India census reports India's sex ratio in the 0–6 age bracket at 1.088. The 2011 birth sex ratios for China and India are significantly above the mean ratio recorded in the United States from 1940 through 2002 (1.051); however, their birth sex ratios are within the 0.98–1.14 range observed in the United States for major ethnic groups over the same time period. Along with Asian countries, a number of European, Middle Eastern, and Latin American countries have recently reported high birth sex ratios in the 1.06 to 1.14 range. High birth sex ratios, according to some studies, can be caused in part by social factors.

Another hypothesis has been inspired by the recent and persistent high birth sex ratios observed in Georgia and Armenia—both predominantly Orthodox Christian societies—and Azerbaijan, a predominantly Muslim society. Since their independence from the Soviet Union, the birth sex ratio in these Caucasus countries has risen sharply, to between 1.11 and 1.20, among the world's highest. Mesle et al. consider the hypothesis that the high birth sex ratio may be because of the social trend of more than two children per family, and birth order possibly affects the sex ratio in this region of the world. They also consider the hypothesis that sons are preferred in these countries of the Caucasus, the spread of scans and there being a practice of sex-selective abortion; however, the scientists admit that they do not have definitive proof that sex-selective abortion is actually happening or that there are no natural reasons for the persistently high birth sex ratios.

Data sources and data quality issues
Reported sex ratios at birth for some human populations may be influenced not only by cultural preferences and social practices that favor the birth or survival of one sex over the other but also by incomplete or inaccurate reporting or recording of the births or the survival of infants. Even what constitutes a live birth or infant death may vary from one population to another. For example, for most of the 20th century in Russia (and the Soviet Union), extremely premature newborns (less than 28 weeks gestational age, or less than 1000 grams in weight, or less than 35 centimeters in length) were not counted as a live birth until they had survived for seven days; if that infant died in those first 168 hours it, would not be counted as an infant death. This led to serious underreporting of the infant mortality rate (by 22% to 25%) relative to standards recommended by the World Health Organization.

When unusual sex ratios at birth (or any other age) are observed, it is important to consider misreporting, misrecording, or under-registration of births or deaths as possible causes. Some researchers have, in part, attributed the high sex ratios reported in mainland China in the last 25 years to the underreporting of the births of female children after the implementation of the one-child policy, though alternative explanations are now generally more widely accepted, including, above all, the use of ultrasound technology and sex-selective abortion of female fetuses and, probably to a more limited degree, neglect or in some cases infanticide of females. In the case of China, because of deficiencies in the vital statistics registration system, studies of sex ratios at birth have relied either on special fertility surveys, whose accuracy depends on full reporting of births and survival of both male and female infants, or on the national population census from which both birth rates and death rates are calculated from the household's reporting of births and deaths in the 18 months preceding the census. To the extent that this underreporting of births or deaths is sex-selective, both fertility surveys and censuses may inaccurately reflect the actual sex ratios at birth.

Gender imbalance

Gender imbalance is a disparity between males and females in a population. As stated above, males usually exceed females at birth but subsequently experience different mortality rates due to many possible causes such as differential natural death rates, war casualties, and deliberate gender control.

Commonly, countries with notable gender imbalances have three characteristics in common. The first is a rapid decline in fertility, either because of preference for smaller families or to comply with their nation's population control measures. Second, there is social pressure for women to give birth to sons, often because of a cultural preference for male heirs. Third, families have widespread access to technology to selectively abort female foetuses.

Some of the factors suggested as causes of the gender imbalance are sex-selective abortion and infanticide, large-scale migration, and behavioral factors statistically linked with sex ratio, such as excessive drinking and violence. Gender imbalance may result in the threat of social unrest, especially in the case of an excess of low-status young males unable to find spouses, and being recruited into the service of militaristic political factions. Economic factors such as male-majority industries and activities, such as the petrochemical, agriculture, engineering, military, and technology industries, also have created a male gender imbalance in some areas dependent on these industries.

One study found that the male-to-female sex ratio in the German state of Bavaria fell as low as 0.60 after the end of World War II for the most severely affected age cohort (those between 21 and 23 years old in 1946). This same study found that out-of-wedlock births spiked from approximately 10–15% during the inter-war years up to 22% at the end of the war. This increase in out-of-wedlock births was attributed to a change in the marriage market caused by the decline in the sex ratio.
 Qatar has the highest male-to-female ratio, with 2.87 males/female. For the group aged below 15, Sierra Leone has the highest female-to-male ratio with 0.96 males/female, and the Republic of Georgia and the People's Republic of China are tied for the highest male-to-female ratio with 1.13 males/female (according to the 2006 CIA World Factbook).

The value for the entire world population is 1.01 males/female, with 1.07 at birth, 1.06 for those under 15, 1.02 for those between 15 and 64, and 0.78 for those over 65.

The "First World" G7 members all have a gender ratio in the range of 0.95–0.98 for the total population, of 1.05–1.07 at birth, of 1.05–1.06 for the group below 15, of 1.00–1.04 for the group aged 15–64, and of 0.70–0.75 for those over 65.

Countries on the Arabian peninsula tend to have a 'natural' ratio of about 1.05 at birth but a very high ratio of males for those over 65 (Saudi Arabia 1.13, Arab Emirates 2.73, Qatar 2.84), indicating either an above-average mortality rate for females or a below-average mortality for males, or, more likely in this case, a large population of aging male guest workers. Conversely, countries of Northern and Eastern Europe (the Baltic states, Belarus, Ukraine, Russia) tend to have a 'normal' ratio at birth but a very low ratio of males among those over 65 (Russia 0.46, Latvia 0.48, Ukraine 0.52); similarly, Armenia has a far above average male ratio at birth (1.17), and a below-average male ratio above 65 (0.67). This effect may be caused by emigration and higher male mortality as a result of higher Soviet-era deaths; it may also be related to the enormous (by western standards) rate of alcoholism in the former Soviet states. Another possible contributory factor is an aging population, with a higher than normal proportion of relatively elderly people, given that, due to higher differential mortality rates, the ratio of males to females reduces for each year of age.

In the evolutionary biology of sexual reproduction the operational sex ratio (OSR), is the ratio of sexually competing males that are ready to mate to sexually competing females that are ready to mate, or alternatively the local ratio of fertilizable females to sexually active males at any given time. This is different from the physical sex ratio because it does not take into account sexually inactive or non-competitive individuals (individuals that do not compete for mates).

Consequences of different sex ratios 

There are several social consequences of an imbalanced sex ratio. It may also become a factor in societal and demographic collapse. For example, the native population of Cusco, Peru at the time of the Spanish conquest was stressed by an imbalance in the sex ratio between men and women. Analyses of how sex ratio imbalances affect personal consumption and intra-household distribution were pioneered by Gary Becker, Shoshana Grossbard-Shechtman, and Marcia Guttentag and Paul Secord.

High ratios of males have a positive effect on marital fertility and women's share of household consumption, and negative effects on non-marital cohabitation and fertility and women's labor supply. It has been shown that the labor supply of married women in the U.S , over time, varies inversely with the sex ratio.

One study used 2021 National Archive of Criminal Justice Data and 2016 U.S. Census Bureau data to show the impact of different gender ratios on men's violence against women in 3165 U.S. cities and counties. The sex ratio ranged from 40% men to 60% men in the data. Rates of violence were lowest in places with a 51% male ratio. For lower and higher proportions of males, the more the ratio deviated from the average, the higher was the violence.

See also 
 Operational sex ratio
 Sex selection
 Sex-selective abortion
 Surplus women
 Missing women

Countries:
 List of sovereign states by sex ratio
 Lost boys (Mormon fundamentalism)
 Missing women of China
 List of Chinese administrative divisions by sex ratio

References